Miguel Ángel D'Annibale (27 March 1959 – 14 April 2020) was an Argentine prelate of the Roman Catholic Church.

Born in Florida Este, Buenos Aires, D'Annibale was ordained to the priesthood in 1985. He later held the role of auxiliary bishop of Río Gallegos and was appointed titular bishop of Nasai in 2011. From 2013 until 2018, he served as bishop of Río Gallegos. From June 2018 until his death in 2020, D'Annibale was bishop of San Martín.

On 14 April 2020, D'Annibale died due to acute myeloid leukaemia in Buenos Aires. He was 61.

References

1959 births
2020 deaths
Deaths from cancer in Argentina
Deaths from acute myeloid leukemia
People from Buenos Aires Province
21st-century Roman Catholic bishops in Argentina
Roman Catholic bishops of Río Gallegos
Roman Catholic bishops of San Martín in Argentina